Rodolfo Aníbal Coria (born in Neuquén June 1, 1959),  is an Argentine paleontologist.

He is best known for having directed the field study and co-naming of Argentinosaurus (possibly the world's largest land animal ever) in 1993, and Giganotosaurus (one of the largest known terrestrial carnivores), in 1996 among other landmark South American dinosaurs, including Mapusaurus, Aucasaurus, and Quilmesaurus. He is a member of the Argentine Paleontological Association, Society of Vertebrate Paleontology, Paleontological Society and The Explorers Club.

He was a leading researcher at the Bernardino Rivadavia Natural Sciences Museum, in Buenos Aires, director of the Museo Carmen Funes in Plaza Huincul (Neuquén Province), from its opening in 1984 until 2007, when he joined the National Research Council of Argentina.

He and his work were featured in the movie Dinosaurs: Giants of Patagonia (2007) and the BBC Horizon documentary Extreme Dinosaurs (2000).

References

External links
BBC Interview of Rodolfo Coria
Interpatagonia.com: Carmen Funes Museum website
Meet the Paleontologist — Rodolfo Coria

Argentine paleontologists
Argentine curators
1959 births
Living people
Place of birth missing (living people)
Directors of museums in Argentina